Nekronology is an album by the German avant-garde/experimental musician Hermann Kopp. It was released in  October 2004 as a CD and in July 2009 as a vinyl LP, with a different artwork. The album is a compilation of Kopp’s soundtracks to the German films Nekromantik,  Der Todesking and Nekromantik 2 by the film director Jörg Buttgereit, completed by two bonus tracks.

Track listing

 "The Loving Dead" – 1:16 	
 "Poison" – 3:57 	
 "Supper" – 1:46 	
 "Fish In A Bowl" – 3:03 	
 "Petrified Slow" – 1:24 	
 "Betty’s Return" – 2:21 
 "Unholy" – 5:36
 "Surprise" – 3:37 	 
 "Home (Domestic Version)" – 2:36 	
 "Vanish" – 4:08
 "Supersonic Tonic" – 2:35 	 
 "Man Drowning Himself In Bathtub" – 2:54 	 
 "Zwi Sabattai" – 5:21 	 
 "Drunk" – 3:39

References

http://www.deadtide.com/reviews/albums/page.php?id=2396 
http://www.lordsofmetal.nl/en/reviews/view/id/5030

External links
 Nekronology at Discogs

2004 albums
Horror film soundtracks